Hans Berggren (born 18 February 1973) is a Swedish former footballer, who last played for Gefle IF.

He came to Gefle, the club where he started his elite career, in the beginning of 2008 from BK Häcken. In the 2008 season he became Gefle's best goalscorer with 11 goals. On 17 May 2011, Berggren announced his retirement from football due to longtime injuries. He played his last game on 26 May 2011, a goalless draw at home against Mjällby.

Clubs 
 Gefle IF 2008–2011
 BK Häcken 2006–2007
 IF Elfsborg 2002–2005
 FK Haugesund 2000–2001
 Hammarby IF 1998–1999
 Gefle IF 1994–1997
 Hamrånge GIF 1990–1993

References

External links
 

Living people
1973 births
Swedish footballers
Gefle IF players
FK Haugesund players
Hammarby Fotboll players
BK Häcken players
IF Elfsborg players
Swedish expatriate footballers
Expatriate footballers in Norway
Swedish expatriate sportspeople in Norway
Allsvenskan players
Eliteserien players
Association football forwards